Nakin (also Romanized as Nākīn) is a village in Darjazin-e Olya Rural District, Qorveh-e Darjazin District, Razan County, Hamadan Province, Iran. At the 2006 census, its population was 229, in 56 families.

References 

Populated places in Razan County